Philippus Jeremia Rudolf Steyn (born 30 June 1967) is a former South African cricketer. He played in three Test matches and one One Day International in 1995. He went to school at Diamantveld High School in Kimberley. He also ran Sportweni Sport Academy, and coaches cricket skills to youngsters alongside fellow former international Corrie van Zyl.

Career 
He made his test debut on 2 January 1995 against New Zealand at Cape Town and opened the batting alongside Gary Kirsten. He added 106 runs with Kirsten for the opening wicket on his debut and scored 38 off 126 balls. His last test appearance was in the one-off test match against New Zealand in March 1995 at Eden Park where he registered his highest career test score with 46 off 193 balls in 220 minutes. He made his ODI debut on 22 October 1995 against Zimbabwe at Harare which was his only appearance in ODI cricket.

He was never recalled to the national team mainly due to his low batting strike rate and slow mode batting. His batting career strike rate stood at 26.85 after featuring in three tests. However, he continued to play in domestic cricket and he managed to work on improving his strike rate in his later career. He ended his domestic career scoring five List A centuries and 11 first-class centuries. He retired from all forms of cricket in 2002 after playing for Northerns in domestic cricket.

Controversy 
On 6 July 2020, South African cricketer Lungi Ngidi offered and insisted fellow players to join his efforts in the stand against racism in a message prior to the start of the 3TC Solidarity Cup. Ngidi insisted that South Africa must take BLM stand like rest of the world. However, Steyn along with few South African white cricketers such as Boeta Dippenaar and Pat Symcox criticised Ngidi in the Facebook blaming him for not addressing and showing equal solidarity in the fight against murdering of white farmers in the country.

References 

1967 births
Living people
South Africa Test cricketers
South Africa One Day International cricketers
South African cricketers
Free State cricketers
Griqualand West cricketers
KwaZulu-Natal cricketers
Northerns cricketers
Cricketers from Kimberley, Northern Cape